Eswatini–United States relations are bilateral relations between Eswatini and the United States.

History

The United States seeks to maintain and strengthen the bilateral relations that have existed since the kingdom became independent in 1968. U.S. policy stresses continued economic and political reform and improved industrial relations.

The United States assists Eswatini with a number of HIV/AIDS initiatives and programs implemented through the U.S. Agency for International Development (USAID), Centers for Disease Control (CDC), the Peace Corps, African Development Foundation, the Department of Labor, and the Department of Defense. In addition, the U.S. supports small enterprise development, education, military training, institutional and human resources development, agricultural development, and trade capacity building. The U.S. is also the largest bilateral donor to the Global Fund, Swaziland's principal HIV/AIDS funding source. The U.S. Government sends about 4 Swazi professionals to the United States each year, from both the public and private sectors, primarily for master's degrees, and about 5 others for three- to four-week International Visitor programs.

In 2003, Peace Corps volunteers returned to Swaziland after a nine-year absence. The current Peace Corps/Swaziland program, Community Health Project, focuses on HIV/AIDS and provides assistance in the execution of two components of the HIV/AIDS national strategy—risk reduction and mitigation of the impact of the disease. Volunteers encourage youth to engage in appropriate behaviors that will reduce the spread of HIV; they work with children orphaned by the HIV/AIDS pandemic; and they assist in capacity building for non-governmental organizations and community-based organizations.

Principal U.S. officials include Ambassador Lisa J. Peterson, Deputy Chief of Mission Sarah Morrison, and Peace Corps Country Director Nwando Diallo. The U.S. maintains an embassy in Mbabane, Eswatini.

See also
Foreign relations of Eswatini
Foreign relations of the United States

References

External links
History of Eswatini - U.S. relations

 
United States
Bilateral relations of the United States